Anna Thomson is an American actress known professionally as Anna Levine. She was also credited as Anna Levine Thompson and Anna Thomson.

Thomson was orphaned at an early age and raised by her adoptive parents in New York City and France. She trained as a ballet dancer before becoming an actress.

She appeared in supporting roles in films such as Heaven's Gate, Desperately Seeking Susan, The Crow and Unforgiven. She had also been known for her work in several of director Amos Kollek's films, such as Sue Lost in Manhattan and Fast Food Fast Women, which gained her cult figure status in France.

In television, she played the role of Anna Rostov on The Colbys, as well as appearing on The Tracey Ullman Show and the HBO comedy sketch show Hardcore TV.

Filmography

References

External links 
 

American adoptees
American ballerinas
American film actresses
American television actresses
Living people
Actresses from New York City
20th-century American actresses
21st-century American actresses
Year of birth missing (living people)